Nicrophorus guttula is a burying beetle described by Victor Motschulsky in 1845.

References
 

Silphidae
Beetles of North America
Beetles described in 1845
Taxa named by Victor Motschulsky